Erhard Lommatzsch (2 February 1886, in Dresden – 20 January 1975, in Frankfurt am Main) was a German Romance philologist.

From 1905 to 1910 he studied classical, German and Romance philology at the University of Berlin, where his teachers included Eduard Norden, Gustav Roethe, Erich Schmidt and Adolf Tobler. In 1913 he obtained his habilitation, and in 1917 was named an associate professor at Berlin University. Later on, he served as a full professor of Romance philology at the universities of Greifswald (from 1921) and Frankfurt am Main (from 1928).

He was a full member of the Mainz Academy of Sciences, a corresponding member of the Bavarian Academy of Sciences and the German Academy of Sciences at Berlin, an honorary member of the Modern Language Association of America and an associate member of the Académie des Inscriptions et Belles-Lettres.

Published works 
From 1925 he published the Altfranzösisches Wörterbuch, an Old French dictionary based on a massive collection of notes compiled by Adolf Tobler. The dictionary totaled 11 volumes and was nearly completed at the time of Lommatzsch's death in 1975. The dictionary is sometimes referred to as the "Tobler-Lommatzsch". Other published works by Lommatzsch are:
 Gautier de Coincy als Satiriker, 1913 – Gautier de Coincy as satirist.
 Ein Italienisches Novellenbuch des Quattrocento : Giovanni Sabadino degli Arientis "Porrettane", 1913 – An Italian novella book of the Quattrocento: Giovanni Sabadino degli Arienti's Porrettane.
 Provenzalisches liederbuch; lieder der troubadours mit einer auswahl biographischer zeugnisse, nachdichtungen und singweisen, 1917 – Provençal songbook; songs of the troubadours with a selection of biographical references, reflections and songs.
 Geschichten aus dem alten Frankreich, 1947 – Stories from medieval France.
 Kleinere Schriften zur romanischen Philologie, 1948 – Smaller writings on Romance philology.
 Beiträge zur älteren italienischen Volksdichtung; Untersuchungen und Texte, 1950 – Contributions to older Italian folk poetry.
 Leben und Lieder der provenzalischen Troubadours, in Auswahl dargeboten, 1957 – Life and songs of the Provençal troubadours.
 Blumen und Früchte im altfranzösischen Schrifttum, 1966 – Flowers and fruits in old French literature.

References 

1886 births
1975 deaths
Writers from Dresden
Humboldt University of Berlin alumni
Academic staff of Goethe University Frankfurt
Academic staff of the University of Greifswald
German philologists
German medievalists
German lexicographers
Romance philologists
Members of the German Academy of Sciences at Berlin
20th-century philologists
20th-century lexicographers